Kwan may refer to:

People
 Kwan (surname) (關), a Chinese surname
 Kwan Cheatham (born 1995), American basketball player for Ironi Nes Ziona of the Israel Basketball Premier League
 nickname of Kwandwane Browne (born 1977), Trinidadian field hockey player
 nickname of Suchakree Kwan Poomjang (born 1975), Thai former professional snooker player
Kwan, Canadian music producer, songwriter and engineer

Other uses  
 Kwan, Canadian music producer, songwriter and engineer
 Kwan (band), a Finnish hip hop/pop group.
 Kwan (martial arts), a Korean term for a school or clan of martial artists. 
 Mandarin (bureaucrat), bureaucrat scholar in the government of Joseon dynasty. 
 String of cash coins (currency unit), a superunit of the Korean mun.

See also
Guan (disambiguation)
Kuang (disambiguation)
Kwon
Quan
Quon (disambiguation)

Lists of people by nickname